"Don't Believe in Love" is a pop song performed by Dido. It is the only official single from her third studio album, Safe Trip Home, but the second single overall. It was released on 27 October 2008. "Don't Believe in Love (Objektivity Mix)" by Dennis Ferrer received a nomination for Best Remixed Recording, Non-Classical at the 52nd Annual Grammy Awards.

Release
The song was premiered on radio stations on 1 September 2008, and was released for download in many European countries from 29 September 2008. It was also released in Australia on this date. The physical single was released in United Kingdom on 27 October 2008, and in Germany on 31 October 2008.

Music video
The music video for the song was filmed in a ranch near Los Angeles, with AlexandLiane as the directors. The video was filmed in September 2008, and premiered on Dido's official YouTube account on 30 October 2008. The music video was available as a free download from the iTunes Store on 3 December 2008, as part of their 2008 "12 Days of Christmas" promotion.

Track listing
 "Don't Believe in Love" (Dido Armstrong, Rollo Armstrong, Jon Brion)
 "Look No Further" (Dido Armstrong, Rollo Armstrong, Jon Brion)

Live performances 
 "Virgin Radio" Le 17/20 – Bruno Guillon & Camille Combal – 22 October 2008
 Live with Regis and Kelly – 7 November 2008
 The Tonight Show with Jay Leno – 10 November 2008
 "KLLC" – 12 November 2008
 The Ellen DeGeneres Show – 12 November 2008
 "Radio Cherie FM", France – 20 November 2008
 TV Total, Germany – 25 November 2008
 "Quelli Che Il Calcio E...", Italy – 14 December 2008
 "Radio RFM", France – 30 December 2008

Charts
The song only peaked at No. 54 on the UK Singles Chart, making it her second lowest charting single to date, until No Freedom charted 5 places lower at 59 in 2013. The song peaked at No. 2 on the Italian Digital Singles Chart. The song has reached No. 20 on the Japan Hot 100. The song was also certified 2× Platinum in Italy.

Certification

Popular culture
"Don't Believe in Love" was featured in the fourth episode of 90210's first season, "The Bubble".

References

2008 singles
2008 songs
Dido (singer) songs
Songs written by Dido (singer)
Songs written by Rollo Armstrong
Songs written by Jon Brion
Song recordings produced by Jon Brion
Sony BMG singles
Pop ballads